No Thanks may refer to:

 No Thanks (collection), a 1935 volume of poetry by E. E. Cummings
 No Thanks! (game), a card game
 No Thanks!: The 70s Punk Rebellion, a compilation album
 A slogan adopted by Better Together (campaign) in the 2014 Scottish independence referendum

See also 
No Thank You (disambiguation)